The Virginius Affair was a diplomatic dispute that occurred from October 1873 to February 1875 between the United States, Great Britain, and Spain (then in control of Cuba) during the Ten Years' War. Virginius was a fast American ship hired by Cuban insurrectionists to land men and munitions in Cuba to attack the Spanish regime there. It was captured by the Spanish, who wanted to try the men onboard (many of whom were American and British citizens) as pirates and execute them. The Spanish executed 53 men but stopped when the British government intervened.

Throughout the ordeal, there was loose talk that the US might declare war on Spain. During the lengthy negotiations, the Spanish government underwent several leadership changes. US consul Caleb Cushing ended the episode by negotiating $80,000 in reparations to be paid to the families of the executed Americans. The Spanish government compensated British families through negotiation before American compensation. The incident was remarkable for the use of international diplomacy for a peaceful settlement implemented by US Secretary of State Hamilton Fish rather than opting for a costly war between the United States and Spain. The Virginius Affair started a resurgence in the US Navy in the late 19th century. Until then its fleet had been inferior to the warships of Spain.

Ten Years' War 
After the American Civil War, the island country of Cuba under Spanish rule was one of the few Western Hemisphere countries where slavery remained legal and was widely practiced. On October 10, 1868, a revolution broke out, known as the Ten Years' War, by Cuban landowners, led by Carlos Manuel de Céspedes. The Spanish, led initially by Francisco Lersundi, used the military to suppress the rebellion. In 1870, Secretary of State Hamilton Fish persuaded President Grant not to recognize Cuban belligerency, and the United States maintained an unstable peace with Spain.

As the Cuban war continued, an international patriotic insurgency began to arise in support of the Cuban rebellion; war bonds were sold in the US to support the Cuban resistance. One of the US Cuban patriots was John F. Patterson, who bought a former Confederate steamer, Virgin, at the Washington Navy Yard, renaming her Virginius. The legality of Patterson's purchase of Virginius would later come to national and international attention. The Cuban rebellion ended in an 1878 armistice after Spanish general Arsenio Martínez-Campos pardoned all Cuban rebels.

Virginius
Virginius was a small, high-speed side-wheel steamer built to serve as a blockade runner between Havana and Mobile, Alabama, for the Confederacy during the Civil War. Originally built as Virgin by Aitken & Mansel of Whiteinch, Glasgow in 1864, she became a prize of the United States when captured on April 12, 1865. In August 1870, Virginius was purchased by an American, John F. Patterson, acting secretly as an agent for Cuban insurgent Manuel Quesada and two US citizens, Marshall O. Roberts and J.K. Roberts. The ship was originally captained by Francis Sheppherd. Both Patterson and Shepphard immediately registered the ship in the New York Custom House, having paid $2,000 to be bonded. However, no sureties were listed. Patterson took a required oath attesting that he was the sole owner of Virginius. The secret purpose of purchasing Virginius was to transport men, munitions, and supplies to aid the Cuban rebellion. The Spanish said that it was an outlaw ship and aggressively sought to capture it.

Capture, trial, and executions

Captain Joseph Fry was made the new captain of Virginius in October 1873. Fry had served in the US Navy for 15 years before joining the Confederacy during the Civil War. Fry was promoted to commodore in the Confederate Navy. However, after that position disappeared after the U.S. victory in 1865, Fry was underemployed. In 1873 he took the job as captain of Virginius. Virginius, moored in Kingston, Jamaica by this time, needed repair, and the boilers were breaking down. As most of the previous crew had deserted, Fry recruited a new crew of 52 American and British men. Many were inexperienced and did not understand that Virginius was supporting the Cuban rebellion. Three were very young recruits, no older than 13 years of age. Virginius took on 103 native Cuban soldiers that arrived on board a New York steamer. The US Consul at Kingston, Thomas H. Pearne, had warned Fry that he would be shot if captured. However, Fry did not believe the Spanish would shoot a blockade runner. In mid-October, Captain Fry, accompanied by four mercenaries, took Virginius to Haiti and loaded the ship with munitions. On October 30, Virginius sailed to Comito to pick up more weapons and then, on the same day, started toward Cuba. The Spanish had been warned when Virginius left Jamaica and sent out the warship  to capture the vessel.

On October 30, 1873 Tornado spotted Virginius on open water  from Cuba and gave chase. Virginius was heavily weighted, and the stress from the boilers caused the ship to take on water, significantly slowing any progress. As the chase continued, Tornado, a fast warship, fired on Virginius several times, damaging the top deck. Captain Fry surrendered Virginius, knowing that his ship's overworked boilers and leaking hull could not outrun Tornado on the open sea. The Spanish quickly boarded and secured the ship, taking the entire crew prisoner and sailing the ship to Santiago de Cuba.

The Spanish immediately ordered the entire crew to be put on trial as pirates. The entire Virginius crew, both American and British citizens, were found guilty by a court martial and were sentenced to death. The Spanish ignored the protest of the US vice-consul, who attempted to give American citizens legal aid. On November 4, 1873, the four mercenaries who accompanied Fry were executed by a firing squad without trial since he had already been condemned as a pirate. After the executions, the British vice-consul at Santiago, concerned that one of the mercenaries killed, George Washington Ryan, claimed British citizenship, wired Jamaica to receive aid from the Royal Navy to stop further executions. Hearing news of the ship's capture and the executions, Altamont de Cordova, a Jamaican resident, was able to get British Commodore A.F.R. de Horsey to send the sloop  under Sir Lambton Loraine, 11th Baronet to Santiago to stop further executions. On November 7, an additional 37 crew members, including Captain Fry, were executed by firing squad. The Spanish soldiers decapitated them and trampled their bodies with horses. On November 8, twelve more crew members were executed until finally, both the USS Wyoming under the command of Civil War Naval hero Will Cushing HMS Niobe reached Santiago. The carnage stopped on the same day that Cushing (and possibly the British Captain Lorraine) threatened local commander Juan N. Burriel that he would bombard Santiago if there were any more executions. 53 were executed at Santiago under Burriel's authority.

US public reaction
The initial press reaction to the capture of Virginius was conservative, but as news of executions poured into the nation, certain newspapers became more aggressive in promoting Cuban intervention and war. The New York Times stated that if the executions of Americans from Virginius were illegal, war needed to be declared. The New York Tribune asserted that actions of Burriel and the Cuban Volunteers necessitated "the death knell of Spanish power in America." The New York Herald demanded Secretary Hamilton Fish's resignation and the recognition by the US of the Cuban belligerency. The National Republican, believing the threat of war with Spain to be imminent, encouraged the sale of Cuban bonds. The American public considered the executions a national insult and rallied for intervention. Protest rallies took place across the nation in New Orleans, St. Louis, and Georgia, encouraging intervention in Cuba and vengeance on Spain.

The British Minister to the United States, Sir Edward Thornton, believed the American public was ready for war with Spain. A large rally in New York's Steinway Hall on November 17, 1873, led by future Secretary of State William Evarts, took a moderate position, and the meeting adopted a resolution that war would be necessary, yet regrettable, if Spain chose to "consider our defense against savage butchery as a cause of war...."

US diplomatic response

Hamilton Fish and State Department

On Wednesday, November 5, 1873, the first news from the US Consul-General in Havana, Henry C. Hall, informed the US State Department that Virginius had been captured. There was no knowledge that four mercenaries had already been killed; Secretary of State Hamilton Fish believed the Virginius was just another ship captured aiding the Cuban rebellion. On November 7, Cuba headed the agenda of US President Ulysses S. Grant's Cabinet meeting as news came in of the deaths of Ryan and three other mercenaries. The Cabinet agreed that the executions would be "regarded as an inhuman act not in accordance with the spirit of the civilization of the nineteenth century." On November 8, Fish met with Spanish minister Don José Polo de Barnabé and discussed the legality of the capture of Virginius.

On November 11, Grant's Cabinet decided that war with Spain was not desirable, but Cuban intervention was possible. On November 12, five days after the event, Fish received the devastating news that 37 crew members of Virginius had been executed. Fish ordered US Minister to Spain Daniel Sickles to protest the executions and demand reparations for any persons considered US citizens who were killed. On November 13, Fish formally protested to Polo and stated that the US had a free hand on Cuba and the Virginius Affair. On November 14, Grant's cabinet agreed that if US reparation demands were not met, the Spanish legation would be closed. An exaggerated report came into the White House that more crew members had been shot. In reality, twelve crew members had been executed. On November 15, Polo visited Fish and stated that Virginius was a pirate ship and that her crew had been a hostile threat to Cuba. Fish, although doubtful of the legality of the ship's US ownership, was determined to advocate the nation's honor in demanding reparations from Spain.

On the same day, a cable from Fish arrived in Spain for Sickles demanding the return of Virginius to the US, the release of the crew that had escaped execution, a salute from Spain to the US flag, punishment for the perpetrators, and reparations for families.

Negotiations in Spain between Sickles and Minister of State José de Carvajal became heated, and progress towards a settlement became unlikely. The Spanish press openly attacked Sickles, the US, and Britain, intending to promote war between the three countries. As the Sickles-Carvajal negotiations broke down, President Emilio Castelar decided to settle the Virginius matter through Fish and Polo in Washington.

On Thanksgiving Day, November 27, Polo proposed to Fish that Spain would give up the Virginius and the remaining crew if the US would investigate the legal status of its ownership. Both Fish and Grant agreed to Polo's offer and that the Spanish salute to the US flag would be dispensed with if Virginius was found not to have legal US private citizen ownership. On November 28, Polo and Fish met at the State Department and signed a formal agreement that included the return of Virginius and crew and an investigation by both governments of the legal ownership of Virginius and any crimes committed by the Spanish Volunteers.

The threat of war between the two countries had been averted through negotiations, but the time and place of the surrender of the Virginius and the remaining crew remained undetermined for several days. On December 5, Fish and Polo signed an agreement that Virginius, with the US flag flying, would be turned over to the US Navy on December 16 at the port of Bahía Honda. Sickles, having lost the confidence of Grant and Fish, resigned on December 20, 1873. On January 6, 1874, after advice from Fish on a replacement for Sickles, Grant appointed eminent attorney and Spanish scholar Caleb Cushing as Minister to Spain.

Virginius and crew returned

On December 16, Virginius, now in complete disrepair and taking on water, was towed out to open sea with the US flag flying to be turned over to the US Navy. US Captain W.D. Whiting on board  agreed with Spanish Commander Manuel de la Cámara to turn over Virginius the following day. On December 17, at exactly 9:00 a.m., Virginius was formally turned over to the US Navy without incident. The same day, after an investigation, US Attorney General George H. Williams ruled that the US ownership of Virginius had been fraudulent and that she had no right to fly the US flag; however, Spain had no right to capture Virginius and her crew on the open sea.

Her 91 remaining crewmen, who had been held as prisoners under harsh conditions, were handed over to Captain D.L. Braine of Juanita and were taken safely to New York City.

Reparations awarded

On January 3, 1874, Spanish President Emilio Castelar was voted out of office and replaced by Francisco Serrano. Cushing, who had replaced Sickles as US Consul to Spain, stated that the US had been fortunate that Castelar, a university scholar, had been President of Spain, given that his replacement, Serrano, might have been more apt to go to war over the affair. Cushing's primary duty was to get Spanish reparations for Virginius family victims and punishment of Burriel for the 53 Santiago executions. Cushing met Serrano in May on June 26, Augusto Ulloa. On July 5, Cushing, now well respected by Spanish authority, wrote to Fish that Spain was ready to make reparations. In October, Cushing was informed that President Castelar had secretly negotiated reparations between Spain and Britain that totaled £7,700, but black British citizen families were given less money. On November 7, Grant and Fish demanded $2,500 from Spain for each US citizen shot, regardless of race.

On November 28, 1874, Fish instructed Cushing that all Virginius crew members not considered British would be considered American.

Spanish Consul Antonio Mantilla, Polo's replacement, agreed with the reparations. Grant's 1875 State of the Union Address announced that reparations were near, quieting anger over the Virginius affair. Reparations, however, were put on hold as Spain changed governments on December 28, from a republic back to a monarchy. Alfonso XII became King of Spain on January 11, 1875.

On January 16, Cushings met with the new Spanish state minister Castro, urged settlement before the US Congress adjourned, and noted that reparations would be a minor matter compared to an all-out war between Spain and the US.

Under an agreement of February 7, 1875, signed on March 5, the Spanish government paid the US an indemnity of $80,000 for the execution of the Americans. Burriel's Santiago executions were considered illegal by Spain, and President Serrano and King Alfonso condemned him.  The case against Burriel was taken up by the Spanish Tribunal of the Navy in June 1876. However, Burriel died on December 24, 1877, before any trial could occur.

In addition to the reparation, a private indemnity in St. Louis was given to Captain Fry's financially troubled family, which had been unable to pay rent and had no permanent place to live.

Aftermath
When the Virginius affair first broke out, a Spanish ironclad—the Arapiles—happened to be anchored in New York Harbor for repairs, leading to the uncomfortable realization on the part of the US Navy that it had no ship capable of defeating such a vessel. US Secretary of War George M. Robeson believed a US naval resurgence was necessary. Congress hastily issued contracts to construct five new ironclads and accelerated its repair program for several more.  and the four  monitors were subsequently built as a result of the Virginius war scare. All five vessels would later take part in the Spanish–American War of 1898.

References

Sources
 Bradford, Richard H. (1980). The Virginius Affair. Boulder: Colorado Associate University Press. .
 
 Swann, Leonard Alexander (1965). John Roach, Maritime Entrepreneur: the Years as Naval Contractor, 1862–1886. — U.S. Naval Institute. (reprinted: 1980. Ayer Publishing). .

Further reading
 Allin, Lawrence Carroll. "The First Cuban War: The Virginius Affair." American Neptune 38 (1978): 233–48. 
 Kmen, Henry A. "Remember the Virginius: New Orleans and Cuba in 1873." Louisiana History 11.4 (1970): 313–331. online
 Nevins, Allan Hamilton Fish: The inner history of the Grant administration (two volumes 1936) 2:657-694. online
 Owen, John Malloy. Liberal Peace, Liberal War: From the Virginius Affair to the Spanish-American War (Cornell University Press, 1997).

External links
 
 Account of the Virginius Incident at the Cuban Genealogy Center Web site
 Virginius Incident at Spanish–American War Centennial
 Virginius at Ships of the World Web site

1873 in international relations
1875 in international relations
Diplomatic incidents
History of the foreign relations of the United States
1873 in the United States
International maritime incidents
19th-century military history of the United States
Ten Years' War
Presidency of Ulysses S. Grant
Spain–United Kingdom relations
Spain–United States relations
Maritime history of Cuba
1873 in Cuba
Maritime incidents in December 1873